Gold Skies is the debut extended play (EP) by Dutch DJ and record producer Martin Garrix. It was released as a digital download on 8 July 2014 on iTunes in North American countries. The EP includes the singles "Animals", "Wizard", "Tremor", "Gold Skies" and "Proxy".

Singles
 "Animals" was released as the lead single from the EP on 17 June 2013.
 "Wizard" was released as the second single from the EP on 2 December 2013.
 "Tremor" was released as the third single from the EP on 21 April 2014.
 "Gold Skies" was released as the fourth single from the EP on 2 June 2014.
 "Proxy" was released as the fifth and final single from the EP on 2 July 2014.

Track listing
All songs written and composed by Martijn Garritsen (Martin Garrix).

Notes
 signifies a remixer

Charts

Release history

References

Martin Garrix albums
2014 debut EPs
Dance music EPs